TROMP Percussion Eindhoven is a biennial percussion competition and festival held in Eindhoven, Netherlands since 1971. In 2012, TROMP will be organising its fourth percussion competition (twenty-first competition in total). It is scheduled to take place from 2 till 11 November 2012.

History
TROMP Percussion Eindhoven is a co-production of the TROMP Biennale Foundation & Muziekgebouw Eindhoven

TROMP International Percussion Competition Eindhoven is a biennial international competition founded in 1971. In 2012 TROMP will be organising its fourth percussion competition (21st competition in total).

The competition is organized by a foundation created in memory of its namesake Theo Tromp (1903-1984), a prominent Eindhoven businessman and strong advocate of culture. Through his legacy and the generous support of the city of Eindhoven, the competition has become an event with international allure. Among its laureates are distinguished musicians like percussionists Claire Edwardes (Australia), Yi-Ping Yang (Taiwan) and Alexej Gerassimez (Germany). All prize-winners have proven themselves to be excellent musicians, with budding international careers. Jury-members of the past have included Evelyn Glennie, Colin Currie, Peter Sadlo, Nancy Zeltsman, Emmanuel Séjourné, Bill Cahn, James Wood, Anders Loguin, Andre Pushkarev, Trilok Gurtu and Terry Bozzio.

The central event of TROMP is the international percussion competition. But it also embodies a weeklong percussion Festival with unique concerts and productions.

Since 1971, TROMP has held 20 competitions during which it has had the honour of welcoming many highly talented participants. Prizewinners of the contest include violinist Emmy Verhey (1971), pianist Bart van de Roer (1996), percussionist Claire Edwardes (2000), the Quatuor Amedeo Modigliani (2004), percussionist Yi-Ping Yang (2006), the Heath Quartet (2008), percussionist Alexej Gerassimez (2010) and percussionist Alexandre Esperet (2012). All prizewinners have proven themselves to be excellent musicians with international careers.

Since October 2007, TROMP is a member of the World Federation of International Music Competitions.

Amenities
All participants will receive board & lodging with host families as well as an reimbursement of their travel costs. TROMP will provide all necessary instruments. Various activities, including masterclasses, will be offered to participants during the competition.

Repertoire Days

In preparation of the solo-percussion competition, TROMP International Percussion Competition Eindhoven organised masterclasses around the globe. Participants were given the opportunity to study and perform the repertoire for the TROMP Competition with renowned percussionists.

The Repertoire Days took place in Boston - U.S.A. (2nd until 5 March), Shanghai - China (6th until 10 March) and Amsterdam - The Netherlands (15 until 18 March).

TROMP Percussion Eindhoven managed to assemble the following percussionists for the TROMP Repertoire Days 2012:

Boston | Boston Conservatory

- Arnold Marinissen (set-up -> Rebonds)
- Emmanuel Séjourné (vibraphone)
- Nancy Zeltsman (preparing competition)

Shanghai | Shanghai Conservatory

- Arnold Marinissen (set-up -> Rebonds)
- Emmanuel Séjourné (vibraphone)
- Yi-Ping Yang (timpani / preparing competition)

Amsterdam | Conservatorium van Amsterdam

- Peter Prommel (marimba)
- Benoit Cambreling (Timpani)
- Andrei Pushkarev (vibraphone)
- Claire Edwardes (marimba / preparing competition)

The jury

Pedro Estevan (Spain)

Jean Geoffroy (France)

Pete Lockett (United Kingdom)

Momoko Kamiya (Japan)

Arnold Marinissen (The Netherlands)

Zoltan Rácz (Hungary)

Nancy Zeltsman (United States of America)

Non-voting chairman of the Jury:

Lucas Vis (The Netherlands)

The Commission

The Commission

An important component of TROMP Percussion Eindhoven is the commissioned composition, written by a prominent composer. During previous editions, composers such as Louis Andriessen (2000), Jacob ter Veldhuis (2006), Steve Martland (2008) and Michael Torke (2010) have created the special TROMP composition. The American composer Nico Muhly will now follow in their footsteps. Nico Muhly was given the task of composing the compulsory work, which will be performed for the first time during the final by the contestants together with Colin Currie and Britten Sinfonia, directed by Bas Wiegers.

A second commission has been given to budding Dutch composer Joey Roukens. He will write the compulsory work for timpani to be performed during the finals.

Nico Muhly - Double Standard

American composer Nico Muhly (1981) is already one of the most popular composers in the world. Premières of his orchestral pieces have already been performed by the Boston Pops Orchestra, the New York Philharmonic and the Chicago Symphony Orchestra. Muhly has also written various film scores, including Joshua (2007) and ‘Best Film’ nominated The Reader (2008). As a performing artist he works as arranger and conductor with numerous other renowned artists, including Philip Glass, Antony and the Johnsons, Björk, Rufus Wainwright, Grizzly Bear and Sufjan Stevens. During season 12/13, Nico Muhly is composer in residence of Muziekgebouw Eindhoven for the fourth consecutive year.

Joey Roukens - Beat Mutations

Rising star Joey Roukens (1982) can easily be described as the forerunner of the next generation of Dutch composers. In recent years he has been commissioned to write pieces by the Koninklijk Concertgebouworkest, Asko|Schönberg, the Storioni Festival and violinist Janine Jansen. Colin Currie performed the première of Roukens’ Percussion Concerto in May 2011. Currie heralded the piece as ‘one of the five best concertos ever written’.

Prizewinners

Prize TROMP Percussion Eindhoven 2010

First prize | Alexej Gerassimez

Prizes TROMP Percussion Eindhoven 2012

First Prize | Winner: Alexandre Esperet

Second Prize | Winner: Garrett Mendelow

Third Prize | Winner: Galdric Subirana

MCN - Willem Vos Prize | Prizewinner: Yu-Ching Wei (Taiwan)
For the best rendition of a composition by a Dutch composer.

Press Prize | Winner: Alexandre Esperet

Friends of TROMP audience award | Winner: Alexandre Esperet
The audience votes for its own favourite during the final.

De Annelie encouragement prize | Prizewinner: Sabrina Suk Wai Ma (United Kingdom)
The Annelie encouragement prize is named after honorary board member Annelie Gelijns-Tromp, daughter of founder Th. Tromp.

Youth Jury Prize | Winner: Garrett Mendelow
The youth jury will choose their own winner, not necessarily one of the finalists.

References

External links
 TROMP Percussion Eindhoven

Music festivals in the Netherlands
Music in Eindhoven
Recurring events established in 1971
1971 establishments in the Netherlands